Dundas is an unincorporated community in Lunenburg County, Virginia, United States. Dundas has a post office with ZIP code 23938, which opened on February 20, 1908. The Dundas Ruritan Club claims to make the best sheep stew in the world, cooking it twice a year in large batches to raise money for Ruritan community-service projects.

References

Unincorporated communities in Lunenburg County, Virginia
Unincorporated communities in Virginia